James Leighman Williams (born September 22, 1985, in Sacramento, California) is an American fencer.

College career
Williams is a graduate of Columbia University.  He fenced for the Columbia Lions fencing team. In his college freshman year, he posted a record of 18–3.  Coming into Columbia he was ranked 8th nationally in Junior men's sabre, and 19th in Senior men's sabre.  Williams originally began fencing with the Sacramento Fencing Club. After graduating from high school, James moved to New York to attend Columbia University.  He graduated in 2007 with a B.A. in United States History and Russian Studies.

In 2006 in his junior year he received All-American status, after placing 5th at the NCAA championships.  He placed 1st in sabre at the North American Cup.  He also finished 4th at the NCAA Regionals, and was named 1st team All Ivy League after winning 14 of 15 Ivy League bouts.

Competitions

He twice finished 7th in the Junior "A" World Cup.  Finished 5th at the World Cup in Louisville, and was 3rd in Under-19 Junior men's saber in 2001.  In 2003 he finished 2nd in the same event, as well as 17th in Division I. He was National Champion in 2012.

In the 2008 Beijing Olympics, he was a substitute, but competed in the gold medal bout against France. He faced Nicolas Lopez (3-5), Julien Pillet (5-5), and Boris Sanson (2-5) in the bout. The U.S overall lost 45 – 37.

He competed on the US team at the 2012 London Olympics where he hoped to "visit a couple pubs...win another medal...[and] develop a passable British accent."  As well as competing in the team event, which he said was his main goal, he competed in the men's individual sabre event.  In the individual event, he reached the second round where he lost to eventual bronze medal winner, Nikolay Kovalev.  The US men's sabre team were knocked out by the Russian team, also featuring Kovalev, in the quarter-final.

References

External links
 James Williams on Columbia's Website
 James Williams on Columbia's Bwog
 James Williams Elected to Academic All Ivy Team
 James Williams in the New York Post
 James Williams at the 2011 Pan American Games

American male sabre fencers
Living people
1985 births
Columbia Lions fencers
Columbia College (New York) alumni
Fencers at the 2007 Pan American Games
Fencers at the 2008 Summer Olympics
Fencers at the 2011 Pan American Games
Fencers at the 2012 Summer Olympics
Olympic silver medalists for the United States in fencing
Medalists at the 2008 Summer Olympics
Pan American Games gold medalists for the United States
Pan American Games silver medalists for the United States
Pan American Games medalists in fencing
Medalists at the 2007 Pan American Games
Medalists at the 2011 Pan American Games